The Man with Nine Lives is a 1940 American horror science fiction film directed by Nick Grinde and starring Boris Karloff.

Both The Man with Nine Lives and The Man They Could Not Hang were based in part on the real-life saga of Dr. Robert Cornish, a University of California professor who, in 1934, announced that he had restored life to a dog named Lazarus, which he had put to death by clinical means. The resulting publicity (including a Time magazine article and motion picture footage of the allegedly re-animated canine) led to Cornish being booted off campus.

Plot
Dr. Tim Mason (Roger Pryor), a medical researcher experimenting in "frozen therapy" visits the deserted home of Dr. Leon Kravaal (Boris Karloff), the originator of the therapy, who has been missing for ten years. After discovering a secret passage in the basement, Dr. Mason and his nurse (Jo Ann Sayers) discover Kravaal frozen in an ice chambers. The doctor and nurse successfully revive Kravaal and Kravaal explains in flashback how he and five other men came to be frozen ten years earlier. One man is found dead. However, the other four men are located and revived. Because of closed-minded prejudice against science, one of the four men destroys Kravaal's formula for "frozen therapy." In an act of rage and self preservation, Kravaal isn't able to stop the man in time from destroying it and shoots and kills him. Not having memorized the formula as of yet, Kravaal holds everyone captive in order to use them as guinea pigs, hoping to unlock the key to "frozen therapy" for a second time.

Cast
 Boris Karloff as Dr. Leon Kravaal
 Roger Pryor as Dr. Tim Mason
 Jo Ann Sayers as Judith Blair
 Stanley Brown  as Bob Adams
 John Dilson as John Hawthorne
 Hal Taliaferro as Sheriff Stanton 
 Byron Foulger as Dr. Henry Bassett
 Charles Trowbridge as Dr. Harvey
 Ernie Adams as Pete Daggett
 Bruce Bennett as a state trooper
Minta Durfee as a frozen therapy patient in opening scene

See also
 Boris Karloff filmography

References

External links
 
 
 
 

1940 films
1940 mystery films
1940s science fiction horror films
1940s English-language films
American black-and-white films
American mystery films
American science fiction horror films
Columbia Pictures films
Films directed by Nick Grinde
1940s American films